Ary Chandra (born November 10, 1984) is a retired Indonesian professional basketball player. He plays for Pelita Jaya Esia Jakarta of the Indonesian basketball league.  He is also a member of the Indonesia national basketball team.

Chandra competed for the Indonesia national basketball team at the FIBA Asia Championship 2009 for the first time.  He averaged 11.4 points per game for the team.

References

1984 births
Living people
Indonesian men's basketball players
Pelita Jaya Esia players
Point guards
Southeast Asian Games bronze medalists for Indonesia
Southeast Asian Games medalists in basketball
Competitors at the 2011 Southeast Asian Games